The European Association of Daily Newspapers in Minority and Regional Languages (MIDAS) is a politically independent, non-profit association for minority daily press with headquarters at the Center for Autonomy Experience at the European Academy (EURAC) in Bozen, South Tyrol, Italy.

MIDAS was formed in the year 2001 by editors-in-chief from more than 10 language communities throughout Europe in order to coordinate their strategies and to stimulate cooperation in the areas of information exchange, printing, and marketing; to organise campaigns to promote publications in minority languages; and to obtain support from state and EU institutions for minority languages and their print media.

Annually MIDAS organises Study Visits for the journalists of its member newspapers and majority press. Program seeks to develop knowledge in editorial work maximising experience of the participants through the exchange of information. The Study Visit Programme is dedicated to report on minority protection and cultural diversity issues within the context of the European Integration process.

MIDAS awards also the Midas and Otto von Habsburg prizes to the journalists of minority and majority press. The judging criteria for the prizes are high journalistic quality and coverage of topics related to minority protection, European integration and promotion of cultural diversity.

27 newspapers from Croatia, Czech Republic, Denmark, Finland, Germany, Italy, Serbia, Lithuania, Romania, Slovakia, Spain and Switzerland have already joined MIDAS, and organization continues to grow. MIDAS member newspapers reach more than 3 million European citizens as readers and are published in 11 languages. MIDAS has carried out EU projects such as Citoyen and NewsSpectrum.

In 2019 Catalan web portal VilaWeb was admitted as a new member of MIDAS, becoming the first fully online media outlet to become a member of the association.

Members 

Source: http://www.midas-press.org/home/members/

Awards

MIDAS Prize for Journalism in Minority Protection and Cultural Diversity in Europe

Winners

Source: http://www.midas-press.org/midas-prize-for-journalism/laureates/

Otto von Habsburg Prize for Journalism in Minority Protection and Cultural Diversity in Europe

Winners

Source: http://www.midas-press.org/otto-von-habsburg-prize/laureates/

References

External links 
 MIDAS-Website
 Institute for Minority Rights at the European Academy Bozen (EURAC) 
 Center for Autonomy Experience

Newspaper associations
Non-profit organisations based in Italy
Organizations established in 2001
2001 establishments in Italy